Bosworth Hall may refer to the following buildings in Leicestershire, England:

 Bosworth Hall (Husbands Bosworth)
 Bosworth Hall (Market Bosworth)

Architectural disambiguation pages